In enzymology, an adenosylcobyric acid synthase (glutamine-hydrolysing) is an enzyme that catalyzes the chemical reaction

4 ATP + adenosylcobyrinic acid a,c-diamide + 4 L-glutamine + 4 H2O  4 ADP + 4 phosphate + adenosylcobyric acid + 4 L-glutamate

The four substrates of this enzyme are ATP, adenosylcobyrinic acid a,c-diamide, L-glutamine, and H2O; its four products are ADP, phosphate, adenosylcobyric acid, and L-glutamate.

This enzyme belongs to the family of ligases, specifically those forming carbon-nitrogen bonds carbon-nitrogen ligases with glutamine as amido-N-donor (Glutamine amidotransferases).  The systematic name of this enzyme class is adenosylcobyrinic-acid-a,c-diamide:L-glutamine amido-ligase (ADP-forming).  This enzyme is part of the biosynthetic pathway to cobalamin (vitamin B12) in bacteria.

See also
 Cobalamin biosynthesis

References

 
 

EC 6.3.5
Enzymes of unknown structure